Francis Eckley Oakeley (5 February 1891 – 1 December 1914) was an English rugby player. Having been educated at Hereford Cathedral School, he later played as a scrum-half and won four caps for England between 1913 and 1914.  He was killed during the First World War,  when the submarine he was serving aboard, HMS D2, disappeared.

References

Further reading

1891 births
1914 deaths
British military personnel killed in World War I
England international rugby union players